Leah Lamarr (born June 14, 1988) is an American comedian, actress and podcast host. She is known for being a comedy show host on the Clubhouse app and co-hosting the Real-Time Crime podcast on iHeartMedia.

Life & career 

Lamarr struggled as a comedian until she joined Clubhouse in 2020. She moderates Hot on the Mic and Afternoon Delight, one of the app's most popular rooms. Lamarr has hosted rooms with Adele and Oprah, an interview she revealed made her sweat. When asked about how much time she spends on the app, Lamarr admits she has FOMO when not on it. On August 29, 2021, she became the app's official icon.

Lamarr has opened shows for Dane Cook, Bill Burr and Nick Kroll.

After discussing the Gabby Petito case with iHeartMedia CEO Conal Byrne, Lamarr was offered a one year deal to co-host a true crime podcast called Real-Time Crime.

In 2022, Lamarr's NFTs tour took place in Los Angeles, London and Edinburgh. The tour focused on her past heartbreaks and love moving forward.

Filmography

References

External links 

 

1988 births
Living people
American film actresses
American women comedians
American women podcasters
21st-century American comedians
American stand-up comedians
People from Queens, New York
21st-century American actresses
Actresses from New York City
American television actresses
American women television personalities
Radio personalities from New York City
Comedians from New York City